Mya is an Italian entertainment TV channel, owned by Mediaset and broadcast on Premium Gallery, a pay television network available on digital terrestrial television in Italy. Its transmission started on January 18, 2008 with the pilot episode of Gossip Girl.

It is targeted at female audiences and broadcasts movies, television series and soap operas.

At the moment, Mya is not available on satellite television, and is not available outside Italy.

Programs

See also 
Mediaset Premium

External links
 

Mediaset television channels
Women's interest channels
Television channels and stations established in 2008
Italian-language television stations